Andrea Vötter (born 3 April 1995) is an Italian luger.

Vötter competed at the 2014 Winter Olympics for Italy. In the Women's singles she placed 19th.
Vötter's best Luge World Cup overall finish is 7th in 2018–19.

References

External links

1995 births
Living people
Italian female lugers
Italian lugers
Lugers at the 2012 Winter Youth Olympics
Lugers at the 2014 Winter Olympics
Lugers at the 2018 Winter Olympics
Lugers at the 2022 Winter Olympics
Olympic lugers of Italy
Sportspeople from Brixen
21st-century Italian women